Buchheri Railway Station is located in  Buchheri small town in sub-district Daur, Shaheed Benazir Abad district Sindh province of Pakistan.  In 2015 Buchheri has been declared town committee. Baalu Ja Qubba is located in Buchheri, where father & mother of former president of Pakistan Asif Ali Zardari are buried in graveyard of Baalu Ja Qubba (Tomb Of Baalu). Dr. Ghulam Mustafa Abbasi, former Director General Health Government Of Sindh is also from a small village Allah Bux near Buchheri.

See also
 List of railway stations in Pakistan
 Pakistan Railways

References

External links

Railway stations in Shaheed Benazir Abad District
Railway stations on Karachi–Peshawar Line (ML 1)